Southeast Ijo is an Ijaw language spoken in southern Nigeria. There are two dialects, Nembe (Nimbe) and Akassa (Akaha).

References

Languages of Nigeria
Ijoid languages